The 1954 United States elections were held on November 2, 1954. The election took place in the middle of Republican President Dwight D. Eisenhower's first term. In the election, the Republicans lost the Congressional majorities they had won in the previous election, due in most part to the backlash from McCarthyism and the numerous controversies it spawned including the Army hearings and the suicide of Democratic Senator Lester C. Hunt. The Democratic gains were modest, but they were enough for the party to win back control of both chambers of Congress.

In the House, the Republicans lost eighteen seats to the Democratic Party, losing control of the chamber. Republicans would not re-take the House until 1994. The Republicans also lost control of the U.S. Senate, losing two seats to the Democrats. Republicans would not re-take control of the Senate until 1980.

See also
1954 United States House of Representatives elections
1954 United States Senate elections
1954 United States gubernatorial elections

References

 
1954
United States midterm elections
November 1954 events in the United States